Agelena doris is a species of spider in the family Agelenidae, which contains at least 1,315 species of funnel-web spiders . It has been described by Hogg, in 1922. It is primarily found in Vietnam.

References

doris
Arthropods of Vietnam
Spiders of Asia
Spiders described in 1922